Bhesan  is a Town in Junagadh district, Gujarat, India.

References

Villages in Junagadh district